Grimoald (or Grimwald) (died 725) was the duke of Bavaria from about 715 to his death. 

He was the youngest of the four sons of Theodo of Bavaria and his wife Folchaid and the uncle of  Swanachild, the second wife of Charles Martel. At first, he co-reigned with his brothers Theodbert, Theobald, and Tassilo II and then, from around 719, alone. His father divided the principality, after involving his two eldest sons with the reign of the duchy in 715. 

Upon Theodo's death in 716, the divided duchy was plunged into civil war and all the brothers save Grimoald were dead by 719. It is not certain if the division of the duchy was territorial or a powersharing scheme, but if the former, it seems most probable that Grimoald's capital was either Freising, which he later favoured as a diocesan seat, or Salzburg, which he later treated as a capital of sorts (Vita Corbiniani).

It was Grimoald who induced Saint Corbinian to come to Bavaria in 724 to evangelise. Grimoald had married his brother's widow, Biltrude (Pilitrud), and by canon law this was incest. Corbinian promptly denounced the duke, who had already repented and relapsed. His anger was now raised and Corbinian had to flee. The next year (725), Charles Martel marched against Bavaria and carried off Biltrude and Swanachild, killing Grimoald in battle.

725 deaths
8th-century dukes of Bavaria
Agilolfings
Year of birth unknown
Baiuvarii